In mathematics, the Thurston norm is a function on the second homology group of an oriented 3-manifold introduced by William Thurston, which measures in a natural way the topological complexity of homology classes represented by surfaces.

Definition

Then  can be represented by a smooth embedding , where  is a (not necessarily connected) surface that is compact and without boundary.

,

This function satisfies the following properties:

When  is compact with boundary, the Thurston norm is defined in a similar manner on the relative homology group  and its Poincaré dual .

It follows from further work of David Gabai that one can also define the Thurston norm using only immersed surfaces. This implies that the Thurston norm is also equal to half the Gromov norm on homology.

Topological applications 

The Thurston norm was introduced in view of its applications to fiberings and foliations of 3-manifolds.

The unit ball  of the Thurston norm of a 3-manifold  is a polytope with integer vertices.

Notes

References

Topology
3-manifolds
Differential geometry